John William Judge (born September 20, 1944) is an American politician from Iowa.

Born in Albia, Iowa, Judge graduated from Albia Community High School and went to Iowa State University He served in the United States Marine Corps and was stationed in Vietnam serving with the military police. Judge was a farmer and banker. He was married to Patty Judge who served in the Iowa Senate and then as Lieutenant Governor of Iowa. Judge had three sons; Douglas, W. Dien, and Joseph. Judge also served in the Iowa Senate from 1999 to 2003 and was a Democrat.

References

1944 births
Living people
People from Albia, Iowa
Military personnel from Iowa
Iowa State University alumni
Farmers from Iowa
Businesspeople from Iowa
Democratic Party Iowa state senators